Sean Cameron (born January 26, 1985 in Brooklyn, New York) is an American-born Guyanese footballer who most recently played for Miami FC in the USSF Division 2 Professional League.

Career

Youth and college
While born in Brooklyn, Cameron grew up in North Brunswick, New Jersey where he attended North Brunswick Township High School. He was a two time first team All State soccer player at North Brunswick. In 2003, Cameron entered the University of Connecticut, playing on the men's soccer team in 2003 and 2004. He played fifteen games as a freshman, but only seven as a sophomore. Frustrated by his low playing time, he transferred  to the Rutgers University in 2005. He finished his career in 2006 at Rutgers.

Professional
On February 8, 2007, Cameron signed with Miami FC of the USL First Division.  He was a regular on the Blues’ back line for nearly two seasons before being traded to the Atlanta Silverbacks in exchange for Ansu Toure on August 16, 2008.

In 2009, he joined the Pittsburgh Riverhounds, and played 10 games for team, before re-joining his first professional club, Miami FC, in 2010.

International
Cameron, who holds both U.S. and Guyana citizenship - the latter through his father - has played for the Guyana national football team.

References

External links 
 Pittsburgh Riverhounds bio
 Atlanta Silverbacks bio
 USL Player Profile

1985 births
Living people
Atlanta Silverbacks players
American soccer players
Guyana international footballers
American sportspeople of Guyanese descent
Miami FC (2006) players
Rutgers Scarlet Knights men's soccer players
USL First Division players
UConn Huskies men's soccer players
USL Second Division players
Pittsburgh Riverhounds SC players
USSF Division 2 Professional League players
Guyanese footballers
Soccer players from New Jersey
People from North Brunswick, New Jersey
Sportspeople from Brooklyn
Soccer players from New York City
Sportspeople from Middlesex County, New Jersey
Association football midfielders